Putous (Comedy Combat is the international name) is a Finnish sketch comedy television show. Its first broadcast was on January 9, 2010. There have been 13 seasons and one Allstars season to date from 2010 to 2020 with CDs (season 3) and DVDs (seasons 1-5) released at the end of each season comprising all episodes.

An Estonian version of the show, Suur Komöödiaõhtu, premiered in 2016.

Seasons

Ratings

Cast 

 = Actor

 = Presenter

DVDs
Putous (29 April 2010) - All season episodes plus additional behind-the-scene footage
Putous 2 (12 May 2011) - All season episodes plus additional behind-the-scene footage 
Putous 3 (14 June 2012) - All season episodes except Putous-UNICEF
Putous 4 (5 June 2013) - All season episodes except Putous-UNICEF
Putous 5 (7 May 2014) - All season episodes except Putous-UNICEF

References

External links 
  
 

Finnish television sketch shows
2010s Finnish television series
2010 Finnish television series debuts
MTV3 original programming